Isaac Adjei Mensah is a Ghanaian politician and member of the Seventh Parliament of the Fourth Republic of Ghana representing the Wassa East Constituency in the Western Region on the ticket of the National Democratic Congress.

Early life and education
Isaac Adjei Mensah was born on Tuesday 26 March 1963. He hails from Dompim Number 1, a town in the Western Region of Ghana. He entered the University of Ghana in 1988 and obtained his bachelor's degree in Sociology in 1991. He later proceeded to the University of Tromsø, Norway in 1992 for his post graduate studies. He graduated in 1997 with his MBA in Public Policy.

Career
Prior to entering politics, Isaac was the Regional Human Resource Manager for Newmont Ghana Limited from 2006 to 2012.

Politics
Isaac Adjei Mensah is a member of the National Democratic Congress (NDC). In 2012, he contested for the Wassa East seat on the ticket of the NDC and won. He was elected once again in 2016 to represent the constituency in the seventh parliament of the fourth republic. In parliament he has served on various committees, some of which include; the Education Committee, the House Committee and the Special Budget Committee.

Personal life
He is married with five children and identifies as a Christian and a member of the Church of Pentecost.

References

Ghanaian MPs 2017–2021
1963 births
Living people
National Democratic Congress (Ghana) politicians
Ghanaian MPs 2021–2025
University of Ghana alumni
University of Tromsø alumni
People from Western Region (Ghana)